Nangin  (English: Nangeen) is a village development committee in Panchthar District in the Province No. 1 of eastern Nepal. At the time of the 1991 Nepal census it had a population of 3264 people living in 578 individual households.

References

Populated places in Panchthar District